Ayaz Jilani (born 5 December 1968) is a Pakistani former cricketer. He played 49 first-class cricket matches for several domestic sides in Pakistan between 1985 and 1998.

See also
 List of Pakistan Automobiles Corporation cricketers

References

External links
 

1968 births
Living people
Pakistani cricketers
Islamabad cricketers
Karachi cricketers
Pakistan Automobiles Corporation cricketers
Pakistan International Airlines cricketers
Cricketers from Karachi